GB Class 3 was a single tram and trailer built by Hønefoss Karosserifabrikk for Graakalbanen of Trondheim, Norway.

The trams were criticized for not having sufficient space for baby buggies. They had seating for 40, later 36, passengers.

The tram were delivered in 1955. It remained in service until 1973, when it was replaced by the TS Class 7 trams, following the merger of Graakalbanen into Trondheim Trafikkselskap, and the subsequent reorganizing of routes, so the Gråkallen Line was operated onwards along the Lademoen Line. It is preserved as a heritage tram at Trondheim Tramway Museum.

References

Trondheim Tramway stock

600 V DC multiple units
Multiple units of Norway